The Stardust Best Comedy/Romance Actress is chosen by the readers of the annual Stardust magazine. The award honours a star that has made an impact with their acting in that certain film.

Here is a list of the award winners and the films for which they won.

See also 
 Stardust Awards
 Bollywood
 Cinema of India

References

External links 

Stardust Awards
Awards for actresses